Edgar Moreira da Cunha, S.D.V. (August 21, 1953) is a Brazilian-born American prelate of the Roman Catholic Church, serving as bishop of the Diocese of Fall River in Massachusetts since 2014.

Biography

Early life 
Edgar M. da Cunha was born on August 21, 1953, in Nova Fátima, Bahia State, in Brazil. He attended a minor seminary in Riachão do Jacuípe, Brazil, run by the Society of Divine Vocations. After joining their order, da Cunha studied philosophy at the Catholic University of Salvador in Salvador, Brazil.  He then moved to the United States to study theology at Immaculate Conception Seminary at Seton Hall University in South Orange, New Jersey, graduating with a Master of Divinity degree.

Priesthood 
Da Cunha was ordained into the priesthood for the Archdiocese of Newark in the Church of St. Michael in Newark, New Jersey on March 27, 1982 by Auxiliary Bishop Joseph Francis.

Da Cunha then served as the parochial vicar and director of vocations for St. Michael Parish. In 1983, da Cunha moved to Saint Nicholas Parish in Palisades Park, New Jersey to serve as parochial vicar and director of vocations there.  De Cunha started a Portuguese language mass at St. Michael's for Brazilian immigrants in the area.

Auxiliary Bishop of Newark
Da Cunha was appointed as an auxiliary bishop of the Archdiocese of Newark as well as titular bishop of Ucres, on June 27, 2003 by Pope John Paul II.  Da Cunha was consecrated at the Cathedral Basilica of the Sacred Heart in Newark on September 3, 2003 by Archbishop John J Myers.  Da Cunha became the first Brazilian-born Catholic bishop in the United States.

Da Cunha served as a member of the archdiocesan Board of Consultors, the Presbyteral Council, the Clergy Personnel Board, and the New Jersey Catholic Conference (NJCC) board of bishops. In October 2003, da Cunha became the regional bishop for Essex County, New Jersey.  In 2005, he was named the archdiocesan vicar for evangelization and in 2013 the vicar general for the archdiocese

Bishop of Fall River
On July 3, 2014, da Cunha was appointed by Pope Francis as the eighth bishop of the Diocese of Fall River; da Cunha was installed on September 24, 2014.

In May 2019, da Cunha suspended Bruce Neylon, pastor of Holy Trinity Parish in Fall River, Massachusetts, based on credible accusations of sexual abuse of a minor during the 1980s. On January 7, 2021, the diocese released a list of 75 priests who had been credibly accused or publicly accused of sexual abuse of minors and vulnerable adults.  Da Cunha made this statement:As your bishop, I am deeply and profoundly sorry for the abuse that was perpetrated by priests within this diocese and have recommitted myself to do everything in my power to ensure this never happens again.”

See also

 Catholic Church hierarchy
 Catholic Church in the United States
 Historical list of the Catholic bishops of the United States
 List of Catholic bishops of the United States
 Lists of patriarchs, archbishops, and bishops

References 
Biography of His Excellency  Retrieved July 5, 2014

External links

Roman Catholic Diocese of Fall River
Roman Catholic Archdiocese of Newark

Episcopal succession

1953 births
Living people
21st-century Roman Catholic bishops in the United States
Roman Catholic bishops of Fall River
Catholic Church in Massachusetts
Roman Catholic Archdiocese of Newark
Brazilian emigrants to the United States
People from Bahia
Religious leaders from New Jersey